Adeline Wuillème (born 8 December 1975 in Reims, Champagne-Ardenne), is a French foil fencer. She competed in three Olympic games.

References

1975 births
Living people
French female foil fencers
Fencers at the 1996 Summer Olympics
Fencers at the 2000 Summer Olympics
Fencers at the 2004 Summer Olympics
Olympic fencers of France
Sportspeople from Reims
Mediterranean Games bronze medalists for France
Mediterranean Games medalists in fencing
Competitors at the 2001 Mediterranean Games